Heartbreak Hospital is a 2002 American thriller comedy film directed by Ruedi Gerber and starring Patricia Clarkson.  It is based on the novel of the same name by Henry Slesar.

Cast
Chelsea Altman as Neely
Patricia Clarkson as Lottie
Diane Venora as Sunday
John Shea as Milo
Demián Bichir as Tonio

Reception
The film has a 25% rating on Rotten Tomatoes.

References

External links
 
 

2002 comedy films
2002 thriller films
2000s comedy thriller films
American comedy thriller films
Films based on American novels
Films produced by Ram Bergman
2000s English-language films
2000s American films